The City is the New York City-based spin-off of The Hills, which aired on MTV from December 29, 2008, until July 13, 2010. 

The original cast included Whitney Port, Olivia Palermo, Jay Lyon, Adam Senn and Erin Lucas, with Roxy Olin and Erin Kaplan joining from the second half of the first season.

Main cast members
  Main cast (appears in opening credits) 
  Supporting cast (3+ episodes)
  Guest cast (1–2 episodes)

Cast notes

Supporting cast members
  Supporting cast (3+ episodes)
  Guest cast (1–2 episodes)

Cast notes

Notes 

City
City
City